Maggie Steed (born Margaret Baker; 1 December 1946) is an English actress and comedian.

Career
After studying drama at the Bristol Old Vic Theatre School in Bristol, Steed left the theatre for several years. She stated: "Actresses in those days had to be 'dolly birds' and I was just Margaret Baker from Plymouth, tall with very gappy teeth, so I became a secretary instead. It was only years later, when I'd grown up politically and become interested in theatre, that I started again and ended up at the Coventry Belgrade Theatre with Clive Russell and Sue Johnston." Steed has performed with the Royal National Theatre and Royal Shakespeare Company and as a comedian.  
 
Her first major television role was playing Rita Moon in the series Shine on Harvey Moon. She played Margaret Crabbe in Pie in the Sky and Phyllis Woolf in Born and Bred. Her television credits include appearances on Fox, Minder, Sensitive Skin and Jam and Jerusalem.

In 2008, Steed appeared on tour in Michael Frayn's comedy Noises Off as Mrs Clackett, produced by the Ambassador Theatre Group, which included the New Victoria Theatre, Woking. The cast included Sophie Bould, Colin Baker and Jonathan Coy. In 2010 she appeared in the short film The Miserables, and the following year onstage in a comedy duo role with actress Jackie Clune in a production of The Belle's Stratagem.

In April 2017, it was announced that Steed was joining the cast of EastEnders as Joyce Murray. It was announced in March 2018 that her character had been written out of the series and subsequently would be killed off.

Political activism
Steed was active in the Campaign Against Racism in the Media. She  appeared in an edition of the BBC's Open Door series on 1 March 1979 (with Stuart Hall) entitled "It Ain't Half Racist, Mum", criticising British television's discussion and representation of immigration and racial stereotypes.

She helped write and perform in the comedy benefit concert An Evening for Nicaragua, at the Shaftesbury Theatre, which was shown on British television in 1983. The cast included Ben Elton, Dawn French, Jennifer Saunders, Emma Thompson and Rik Mayall. Steed visited Nicaragua in 1982 with Andy de la Tour.

Film

Television
 Coronation Street – as Ellen Smith (1970)
 Shine on Harvey Moon – as Rita Moon (1982)
 Minder – "Broken Arrow" episode as Sherry (1982)
 The Young Ones – "Demolition" (1982) and "Sick" (1984)
 Victoria Wood As Seen on TV – "The Making of Acorn Antiques" as Marion Clune (Producer) (1985)
 Intimate Contact – Becca Crichton (1987)
 Lovejoy – "One Born Every Minute" episode as Joanna (1991)
 Red Dwarf – "Quarantine" episode as Dr. Hildegarde Lanstrom (1992)
 Lipstick on Your Collar – as Aunt Vickie (1993)
 Martin Chuzzlewit – as Mrs. Todgers (1994)
 Pie in the Sky – as Margaret Crabbe (1994–1997)
 Inspector Morse – "Death Is Now My Neighbour" episode as Angela Storrs (1993)
 Let Them Eat Cake – as Madame Vigée-Lebrun (1999)
 Midsomer Murders – the episodes "Judgement Day" as Rosemary Furman (2000), "Left For Dead" as Lynne Fox (2008) and "Schooled in Murder" as Sylvia Mountford (2013)
 Foyle's War – "The White Feather" episode as Margaret Ellis (2002)
 French and Saunders – several episodes (1998 and 2004)
 Born and Bred – Phyllis Woolf (2002–2005)
 Jam and Jerusalem (2006–2009) – Eileen
 New Tricks – "Dockers" episode as Rose Dyer (2006)
 Sensitive Skin as Veronica
 My Family as Mrs Philbin (2008)
 Lark Rise to Candleford (2009)
 Whites (2010)
 32 Brinkburn Street (2011) – Elizabeth
 Stella (2012) – Meg
 Chewing Gum (2015–2017) – Esther
 EastEnders (2017–2018) – Joyce Murray, 54 episodes
 Father Brown –  “The Whistle in the Dark“ episode as Dorothy Parnell (2019)
 Elizabeth Is Missing – Elizabeth (2019)
 Ten Percent – Stella Hart (2022)

Theatre
 The Heiress – as Aunt Lavinia (National Theatre) (2000)
 The Importance of Being Earnest – as Lady Bracknell (2005)
 Relative Values – as the Countess of Marshwood (Salisbury Playhouse production) (2005)
 The History Boys – replaced Frances de la Tour as Mrs. Lintott (National Theatre) (2006)
 Noises Off – as Dotty Otley (UK Touring Production) (2008)
 Hay Fever – as Judith Bliss (West Yorkshire Playhouse) (2010)

References

External links

"The Miserables", at IMDb
"Theatre: Debut – Maggie Steed" Interview by David Benedict in The Independent (London), 22 March 2000
The History Boys on Broadway 
"Review: Relative Values" at bbc.co.uk

Living people
1946 births
20th-century English actresses
21st-century English actresses
Actresses from Plymouth, Devon
Alumni of Bristol Old Vic Theatre School
English film actresses
English stage actresses
English television actresses